The Pengra Pass rail route, also known as the Natron Cutoff, the Cascade Subdivision, or the Cascade Line, is a Union Pacific Railroad line (originally a Southern Pacific Railroad line) connecting Eugene, Oregon, with Klamath Falls, Oregon. Construction of the line began in 1905 and was completed in the mid-1920s. The line heads southeast from Eugene, up the Cascades and over Pengra Pass, then southward beside U.S. Route 97 to Klamath Falls, where it splits in two, each track continuing into California. The route has at least 22 tunnels, several snow sheds and multiple bridges across canyons.

The Pengra Pass route was built to provide trains running between Eugene and California with a cheaper and otherwise more practical option than to follow the older Siskiyou Pass route, which runs south from Eugene and over Siskiyou Pass to California. As a result, the Siskiyou Pass route was rendered nearly obsolete. In 2008, a landslide in the area shut down rail traffic for 105 days, which forced Union Pacific trains to make lengthy detours and Amtrak to halt services between Eugene and Sacramento, severing a key west coast rail link. In 2011, no trains had used the Siskiyou Pass route in almost a decade. By 2015 however, that line was reopening to relieve I-5 of local truck traffic. On May 29, 2018, one of the tunnels, known as Tunnel 11, caved in during scheduled maintenance work, shutting down rail traffic for 3 weeks. Union Pacific rerouted their freight trains running between Northern California and Portland through a lengthy detour, while Amtrak service did not operate between Eugene and Sacramento (initially between Eugene and Klamath Falls, with a bus bridge between the two points).

Nonetheless, a major helper operation is demanded by the Pengra Pass route's  of constant grade—the longest anywhere on the former Southern Pacific system, including Donner Pass.

The right-of-way is surrounded by waterfalls and streams running through a Douglas fir forest. At many locations, the track runs atop the steep southern slopes of the Salt Creek canyon.

See also
List of mountain passes in Oregon
List of Oregon railroads
List of tunnels documented by the Historic American Engineering Record in Oregon
Oregon Eastern Railway (SP predecessor)
Pengra Bridge

References

External links
Historic American Engineering Record (HAER) documentation:

Historic American Engineering Record in California
Historic American Engineering Record in Oregon
Southern Pacific Railroad
Rail transportation in Oregon
Union Pacific Railroad lines